Long Lake (Nova Scotia) could mean  the following :

Annapolis County

Long Lake at 
Long Lake at 
Long Lake at

Municipalite Argyle Municipality

Long Lake at

Cape Breton Regional Municipality

Long Lake at

Municipality of the District of Chester

Long Lake at 
Long Lake at 
Long Lake at 
Long Lake at

Municipality of Clare

Long Lake at

Colchester County

Long Lake at 
Long Lake at 
Long Lake at 
Long Lake at 
Long Lake at 
Long Lake at

Cumberland County

Long Lake at 
Long Lake at

Guysborough County

Long Lake at 
Long Lake at 
Long Lake at 
Long Lake at 
Long Lake at 
Long Lakeat

Hants County

Long Lake at 
Long Lake at

Halifax Regional Municipality

Long Lake at 
Long Lake at 
Long Lake at 
Long Lake at 
Long Lakeat 
Long Lake at 
Long Lakeat 
Long Lake at 
Long Lake at 
Long Lake at 
Long Lakeat 
Long Lakeat 
Long Lake at 
Long Lake at 
Long Lakeat 
Long Lake at 
Long Lake at 
Long Lake at

Kings County

Long Lake at

Pictou County

Long Lake at

Region of Queens Municipality

Long Lake at 
Long Lake at

Lunenburg County

Long Lake at

Richmond County

Long Lake at 
Long Lake at

Shelburne County

Long Lake at

Municipality of the District of Staint Mary's

Long Lake at 
Long Lake at 
Long Lake at 
Long Lake at 
Long Lake at 
Long Lake at 
Long Lake at 
Long Lakes at

Victoria County

Long Lake at

Yarmouth County

Long Lake at

Other

Rivers
Long Lake Brook in Colchester County at 
Long Lake Brook in Colchester County at 
Long Lakes Brook in Colchester County at

Park
Long Lake Provincial Park in the Halifax Regional Municipality at

References
Geographical Names Board of Canada
Explore HRM
Nova Scotia Placenames

Lakes of Nova Scotia